Robartus Johannes (Bert) van der Spek (born 18 September 1949 in Zoetermeer) is a Dutch ancient historian, specializing in the Seleucid Empire. He was a full professor in Ancient Studies at VU University Amsterdam from 1993 to his retirement in 2014, and is currently working on the Babylonian Chronicles of the Hellenistic Age (a collection of cuneiform tablets in the British Museum). 
He is also the author of the best-selling first-year book for ancient history: An introduction to the Ancient World.

Van der Spek studied History beginning in 1967 at Leiden University.

Publications
 L. de Blois & R. J. van der Spek, An Introduction to the Ancient World (1997 Routledge; London, New York)
 I. Finkel & R. J. van der Spek, Babylonian Chronicles of the Hellenistic World (forthcoming)

External links
Babylonian chronicles
Cuneiform sources for the history of Hellenistic Babylonia.Edition and Analysis: information about the BCHP Project in the scientific portal NARCIS (KNAW)
 Interview (in Dutch)
Personal page contains overview of all publications

1949 births
Living people
Dutch classical scholars
20th-century Dutch historians
Historians of antiquity
Leiden University alumni
People from Zoetermeer
Academic staff of Vrije Universiteit Amsterdam
21st-century Dutch historians